Lat Krabang Station is an Airport Rail Link station on Thanon Rom Klao in Lat Krabang District, Eastern Bangkok. It is serving by ARL City Line.

Connections 
The station is located with the same name station, with connections to long-distance trains on the Eastern Line.

Future Eastern HSR 
The ARL is intended to be the backbone of the future High Speed Rail line (HSR) to Chonburi and Rayong. This would use the current ARL tracks, and would connect all three nearby airports; starting at Don Mueang International Airport and passing through Bang Sue Central Station, Makkasan Station, Suvarnabhumi International Airport, Chachoengsao, Chonburi, Si Racha, Pattaya and terminating at U-Tapao International Airport.

Station layout

References

Airport Rail Link (Bangkok) stations